Ctenopseustis fraterna, the brownheaded leafroller or the rusty ponga leaf-tyer, is a species of moth of the family Tortricidae. It is found in New Zealand, where it has been recorded from the North Island only. The common name is also used for the related species Ctenopseustis herana and Ctenopseustis obliquana.

Description 
The larva has a green coloured body and brown head.

Adults have a dark chocolate, purplish or chocolate/orange brown/ash colour pattern.

Behaviour 
The larvae of this species create a silken shelter by tying together the fronds of its host and then hides within this creation. The adult moth is on the wing all year round.

Hosts 
The larvae feed on Cyathea dealbata, Cyathea smithii, Dicksonia fibrosa, Dicksonia squarrosa and Sticherus cunninghamii.

References

Moths described in 1930
Archipini
Moths of New Zealand